Edward Van de Velde (19 June 1930 – 7 March 2010) was a Belgian cyclist. He competed in the sprint event at the 1948 Summer Olympics.

References

External links
 

1930 births
2010 deaths
Belgian male cyclists
Olympic cyclists of Belgium
Cyclists at the 1948 Summer Olympics
People from Hamme
Cyclists from East Flanders